The 0s covers the first nine years of the Anno Domini era, which began on January 1, AD 1 and ended on December 31, AD 9, almost aligned with the 1st decade (1–10).

0s may also refer to:
 Tens (the second column of magnitude in the decimal system)
 The plural of 0
 The period from 1–99, almost aligned with the 1st century (1–100).
 The period from 1–999, almost aligned with the 1st millennium (1–1000). 
 Any decade or the term decade in general.

See also 
 0S (disambiguation)
 List of decades, centuries, and millennia